Gofa Zone (Amharic "Greater Gofa Area") was one of the 17 Zones in the Southern Nations, Nationalities, and Peoples' Region of Ethiopia. Part of the Southern Nations, Nationalities, and Peoples' Region, Gofa Zone was bordered on the south by Kamba and Daramalo woredas, on the southwest by the Debub (South) Omo Zone, on the west by the Basketo special woreda, on the northwest by Dawro Zone, on the north by the Dawro Zone, and on the east by Kucha. The administrative center of Gofa Zone is Sawla; other towns included Bulki. Gofa Zone was separated for Demba Gofa Woreda, Geze Gofa Woreda, Zala Woreda, Malo Koza Woreda, Gada Woreda, Uba Debretsehay Woreda, Oyda Woreda and the two town Administrations Sawla town and Bulki town.

Gofa Zone is part of a region known for hilly and undulating midland and upper lowland terrain; due to terrain and weather patterns, less than one in five households is food secure. Food crops include maize, enset, sweet potatoes, taro, teff, and yams; income sources include butter and selling firewood. According to a 2004 report, Gofa Zuria had 75 kilometers of all-weather roads for an average road density of 44 kilometers per 1000 square kilometers.

Demographics

Notes 

Districts of the Southern Nations, Nationalities, and Peoples' Region